"Take Care Of Your Homework" is a single recorded by singer Johnnie Taylor and released on the Stax label in early 1969. The single reached number two on the Billboard Hot R&B Singles chart and number twenty on the Billboard Hot 100. The song was written by Stax staffers Homer Banks, Don Davis, Raymond Jackson, and Thomas Kelly.  The B-side featured the song "Hold On This Time", written by Homer Banks, Don Davis and Raymond Jackson.

Tracks
 "Take Care Of Your Homework" - 2:35 	
 "Hold On This Time" - 2:35

Chart positions

References

1969 singles
Johnnie Taylor songs
Songs written by Homer Banks
Songs written by Raymond Jackson (songwriter)
1969 songs
Songs written by Don Davis (record producer)
Stax Records singles